Marilyn Hagerty ( Hansen; born May 30, 1926) is an American newspaper columnist writing for the Grand Forks Herald. She has been with the paper since 1957, when her husband, Jack Hagerty (1918–1997), became editor of the paper. She garnered a measure of fame in March 2012 when her review of a new Olive Garden restaurant in Grand Forks, North Dakota, was noticed by online news aggregators and became an overnight sensation among both critics and admirers. Anthony Bourdain announced plans to collaborate with Hagerty and subsequently published and wrote a foreword for her 2013 book Grand Forks: A History of American Dining in 128 Reviews.

Hagerty was awarded the 2012 Al Neuharth Award for Excellence in the Media. 

Hagerty appeared as a guest Quickfire Challenge judge on Top Chef: Seattle "Even the Famous Come Home".

In September 2021, aged 95, she was reported to be recovering from an unspecified medical procedure.

Career
Marilyn Hagerty, then Marilyn Hansen, began her career in the 1940s when she was a high school student and worked for the Pierre, South Dakota Capital Journal.

By the 1970s, Hagerty had a regular column, and she also began a column of historical reminiscences, That Reminds Me. She was reviewing restaurants at least by 1976. She retired from full-time newspapering in 1991, but soon came back with a part-time schedule but a full-time workload. Hagerty writes five columns for the paper, and does not consider herself a food critic.

Collections
Three collections of Hagerty's columns have been published:
 Echoes: A Selection of Stories and Columns by Marilyn Hagerty (1994, 246 pages)
The Best of The Eatbeat with Marilyn Hagerty (2012, self-published e-book)
Grand Forks: A History of American Dining in 128 Reviews (2013)

2012 Olive Garden review
In March 2012, for her "Eatbeat" column, Hagerty wrote a review of a recently opened Olive Garden restaurant in Grand Forks, ND. The review was overall positive, stating that "the chicken Alfredo ($10.95) was warm and comforting on a cold day," and calling the Olive Garden "the largest and most beautiful restaurant now operating in Grand Forks."

Blogs started linking to the review the day after it was published, due to the novelty of an unironic, positive review of a chain restaurant. In an interview, Hagerty said she was unfazed by the attention, though she found much of it "rather condescending". She appeared March 20, 2012 on Anderson and was interviewed on CNN and ABC.

Her son James R. Hagerty, a reporter for the Wall Street Journal, wrote an article in that newspaper about her newfound fame. He noted that "She doesn't like to say anything bad" in her reviews, and "If she writes more about the décor than the food, you might want to eat somewhere else."

Personal life
Hagerty is of Danish descent. In addition to her son (James), she and her husband had two daughters, Gail Hagerty (born 1953), presiding judge of the South Central Judicial District of North Dakota, chambered in Bismarck (whose husband Dale Sandstrom is a justice of the North Dakota Supreme Court) and Carol Werner (1954–2011), a lawyer.

During the 1997 Grand Forks flood, Jack and Marilyn Hagerty evacuated to Bismarck, North Dakota, where Jack died on June 13, 1997.

References

External links

Blog

1926 births
Living people
American columnists
American food writers
Writers from North Dakota
American Lutherans
American people of Danish descent
People from Grand Forks, North Dakota
Journalists from North Dakota
American women columnists
21st-century American women